"Still Standing" is a song by Australian group, Hilltop Hoods. It was released in September 2009 as the second single from their fifth studio album, State of the Art. The song peaked at number 34 on the ARIA charts.

The song "Your Teeth in my Neck" by Scientist (musician) was sampled heavily throughout the song.

Track listing

Charts

Weekly chart

Year-end chart

Certifications

References

2009 singles
2009 songs
APRA Award winners
Hilltop Hoods songs
Golden Era Records singles
Songs written by Suffa
Songs written by MC Pressure